Luxembourg's National Olympic Committee, the Luxembourg Olympic and Sporting Committee, was founded in 1912 and sent its first team to the 1912 Summer Olympics in Stockholm.

Only three athletes won medals competing for Luxembourg in the Summer Olympics: weightlifter Joseph Alzin, silver in  1920, and runner Josy Barthel, gold in 1952. In the late 20th-century, it was discovered that runner Michel Théato, whose medal was previously given to France, was actually Luxembourgish. Théato won the gold medal in the men's marathon.

Luxembourg first competed at the Winter Olympic Games in 1928, and has taken part in a total of seven Winter Games.  Thus, despite having been one of the earliest countries to take part, Luxembourg has competed in relatively few of the Games.  In the seven Games, Luxembourg has won a total of two medals: both silver, and won by Marc Girardelli in 1992.

After Luxembourg's first appearance, in St. Moritz, and the country's second appearance, at the 1936 Games in Garmisch-Partenkirchen, Luxembourg did not compete at the Olympics for another five decades.  As a low-lying country, whose highest peak (the Kneiff) lies only 560 metres (1,837 ft) above sea level, Luxembourg had little pedigree in most Winter Olympic sports.

However, the naturalisation of Marc Girardelli, an Austrian-born alpine skier, saw Luxembourg return to the Games in 1988.  In the following Winter Olympics, in 1992 in Albertville, Girardelli won Luxembourg's first two Winter Olympic medals, scooping silver in both the Giant Slalom and Super G.

Neither Girardelli, nor Luxembourg, has won another Winter medal since 1992, but the country's return to the Winter world stage has been maintained by the appearance of two ice skaters in subsequent Games: Patrick Schmit in 1998 and Fleur Maxwell in 2006.

Luxembourg qualified for the 2010 Winter Olympics with two athletes but did not participate because one did not reach the criteria set by the NOC and the other was injured before the Games.

Medal tables

Medals by Summer Games

Medals by Winter Games

Medals by summer sport

Medals by winter sport

List of medalists

See also
 List of flag bearers for Luxembourg at the Olympics
 :Category:Olympic competitors for Luxembourg
 Luxembourg at the Paralympics

References

External links
 
 
 
 Comité Olympique et Sportif Luxembourgeois (French)